PSSA may stand for:

 Pennsylvania System of School Assessment
 Postsunset authorization (in AM broadcasting), an American radio permission to broadcast in AM after sunset
 Particularly Sensitive Sea Area, protected areas of seas, oceans or large lakes
Philosophical Society of South Africa
Physica Status Solidi A, a scientific journal
 Preliminary System Safety Assessment, a recommended technique in the aerospace ARP4761 practice for using common modeling techniques to assess the safety of a system being developed
 Public Statues and Sculpture Association, an organisation with an interest in British public sculptures

Football clubs
 PSSA Asahan, an Indonesian football club
 PSSA Rapids, a defunct American soccer team